The 1997–98 Western Michigan Broncos men's basketball team was a National Collegiate Athletic Association (NCAA) Division I college basketball team that played in the Mid-American Conference (MAC).  The Broncos, 21–8 overall and 12–4 in the conference, shared a piece of the MAC West Division title and earned an at-large bid in the 1998 NCAA Division I men's basketball tournament.

As an 11-seed, WMU upset six-seeded Clemson in the first round of the NCAA Tournament before falling to eventual Final Four team Stanford in the second round.

Preseason

The Broncos were picked to finish fourth in the MAC West Division and received one first-place vote. They won their two exhibition games, defeating Marathon Oil, 83–66 and the Ohio All-Stars, 93–71.

Season
WMU defeated Michigan 68–63 in the opening game of the season. Senior guard Saddi Washington scored 33 point on 10–22 shooting and the 12 point underdogs overcame an 11-point deficit with a 26–10 run to end the game.

Hoosier Classic
Western Michigan participated in the 1997 Hoosier Classic, the 16th-annual holiday tournament held at Market Square Arena in Indianapolis, Indiana.  The Broncos played UNC Charlotte in the first game of the tournament, winning 81–65.  In the championship game against Indiana, WMU held a 31–29 lead at the half before losing 70–63.  Saddi Washington was named tournament MVP.

Conference tournament
Western Michigan finished the season tied with Ball State with the best conference record but lost the head-to-head tiebreaker and was given the No. 2 seed in the conference tournament.  In the first round of the tournament, WMU faced No. 7 seed Miami on their home court in Kalamazoo, Michigan.  Miami upset the Broncos 67–63 but the notable event of the game was Miami coach Charlie Coles collapsing midway through the first half.  The game was stopped while Coles was transported to a local hospital.  Without Coles, the game resumed about two hours later.

NCAA tournament
Western Michigan received an at-large bid in the 1998 NCAA Division I men's basketball tournament and were seeded No. 11. In the first round, they upset No. 6 Clemson 75–72. Their second round opponent, No. 3 Stanford defeated No. 14 College of Charleston in the first round. Stanford defeated WMU 83–65 to end the Broncos season.

Roster
The following table lists WMU's roster.

Schedule

References

External links
 Western Michigan University men's basketball media guide 

Western Michigan Broncos
Western Michigan Broncos men's basketball seasons
Western Michigan